James Dooley may refer to:
 James A. Dooley (1914–1978), American jurist
 James Dooley (composer) (born 1976), film score composer
 James H. Dooley (1841–1922), Virginia lawyer and politician
 James Dooley (Australian politician) (1877–1950), twice premier of New South Wales in the early 1920s
 Jim Dooley (1930–2008), former American football player
 James Dooley (Rhode Island politician) (1886–1960), sports figure in Rhode Island
 James Monaghan Dooley (1822–1891), Irish-born surveyor and politician in Tasmania, Australia